Sir Richard Benjamin Richardson, KCN (born 12 January 1962) is a former West Indies international cricketer and a former captain of the West Indian cricket team.

He was a flamboyant batsman and superb player of fast bowling. He was famous for his wide-brimmed maroon hat which he wore in preference to a helmet against even the fastest bowlers, though in his later career, he started wearing a helmet in preference to wearing a hat.
Richardson captained the West Indies in 24 Tests between 1991 when he took over from Viv Richards and 1995, winning 11, losing 6, and the rest ending in draws.

Early days
Richardson was born in Five Islands Village, Antigua. He began his career with the Leewards Islands in 1982 as an opener.

International career
After his second season he was called up by the West Indies to tour India in the 1983–84 season. Richardson joined a successful West Indies Test team captained by Clive Lloyd batting in the middle order. His first tour started inauspiciously when Richardson lost his luggage and was left with few clothes. Veteran fast bowler Andy Roberts felt that Richardson was not getting enough practice as in the nets even bowlers were given a chance to bat ahead of him and by the time Richardson had an opportunity the main bowlers had finished. Roberts went out of his way to bowl at Richardson during the tour to make sure he had some preparation.

On 24 November 1983, Richardson debuted in the fourth match of the six-Test series, at which point the West Indies had a 2–0 lead, replacing Gus Logie who had bagged a pair in the previous Test. In his first innings Richardson too failed to score a run when was the victim of a poor umpiring decision. He was given out leg before wicket off the bowling of off-spinner Shivlal Yadav though he had hit the ball. He was more successful in the second innings, making 26 before he was bowled, and the match ended in a draw.

1985 World Championship of Cricket
Australia hosted the World Championship of Cricket in February and March 1985 to commemorate the founding of Victoria. During the group stages the West Indies faced Sri Lanka at the Melbourne Cricket Ground on a pitch with uneven bounce. Though the West Indies won the match, a delivery from Ashantha de Mel reared and hit Richardson in the face; with Larry Gomes, he was one of two West Indian batsmen to retire hurt during the game.

Captaincy
Late in 1991, West Indies captain Viv Richards informed the West Indies Cricket Board of his intention to relinquish the Test captaincy and retire after the 1992 World Cup. Though Richards had publicly picked Desmond Haynes as his successor, the board chose Richardson to take over the captaincy and Richards was dropped from the team. Richardson supported the board dropping his predecessor, which led to ill-feeling towards him in Antigua, the home of both men. The West Indies never lost a series under Richards' leadership, so there was a great deal of pressure on Richardson. Under his captaincy, Curtly Ambrose and Courtney Walsh led the bowling attack and Brian Lara emerged as a world-class batsman. In the 4 years of his captaincy, the West Indies only lost one series – versus Australia in 1995 which was the West Indies' first series defeat since 1980.

Trivia
Richardson played 86 Test matches until 1995 scoring 5,949 runs and 16 centuries. He was very successful against Australia, hitting 9 centuries against them, and scored his highest score of 194 against India in Guyana in 1989. He also played 224 One Day Internationals including 3 World Cups.

Late career
Coming into the 1996 World Cup Richardson was under pressure as captain, and the tournament would prove to be his last in international cricket. In the group stages the West Indies suffered a shock defeat at the hands of Kenya, prompting the Caribbean media to call for Richardson's resignation. Despite the setback, the team progressed to the semi-final where they lost to Australia; it was his last match for the West Indies.

Reflecting on his decision to retire years later, Richardson remarked "I resigned and retired because I was suffering from chronic fatigue syndrome, I was burnt out and it was a struggle to continue playing cricket. Every day was stressful, everybody wanted a piece of you and I had no time for myself. I was training harder and trying hard on the field but I couldn't do what I wanted to do. I felt like I was selling myself and my fans short. They wanted me to continue, but if I had I would have got ill so it was time to move on."

Domestic career
Richardson also played for Yorkshire in the English County Championship in 1993 and 1994. In 2009 he was signed to Thames Ditton Cricket Club in Surrey.

After his retirement from international cricket, Richardson became the first high-profile signing by the English all-star club cricket team Lashings World XI, and is the current captain of the team. In 2006 he smashed a double hundred with included four sixes of a hapless Robert Saunders over. Since 2001 he has also played bass guitar in reggae band Big Bad Dread and The Baldhead, alongside Curtly Ambrose and the band has released several albums.

Cricket administration
In January 2011, Richardson was appointed the West Indies' team manager for a period of two years, and was appointed a Knight Commander of the Order of the Nation (KCN) by the Antiguan Barbudan government on 28 February 2014.

Richardson was appointed to the Elite Panel of Match Referees by the International Cricket Council (ICC) on 21 September 2015.

References

External links
 

1962 births
Living people
Leeward Islands cricketers
Northerns cricketers
Windward Islands cricketers
West Indies One Day International cricketers
West Indies Test cricketers
West Indies Test cricket captains
People from Saint John Parish, Antigua
West Indian cricketers of 1970–71 to 1999–2000
Yorkshire cricketers
Cricketers at the 1987 Cricket World Cup
Cricketers at the 1992 Cricket World Cup
Cricketers at the 1996 Cricket World Cup
Cricketers at the 1998 Commonwealth Games
Commonwealth Games competitors for Antigua and Barbuda
Wisden Cricketers of the Year
Antigua and Barbuda expatriate sportspeople in England
Antigua and Barbuda cricketers
Cricket players and officials awarded knighthoods
Marylebone Cricket Club cricketers
Recipients of the Order of the Nation (Antigua and Barbuda)
Antigua and Barbuda cricket coaches
West Indies B cricketers
M Parkinson's World XI cricketers